This is the results breakdown of the local elections held in Asturias on 25 May 2003. The following tables show detailed results in the autonomous community's most populous municipalities, sorted alphabetically.

Overall

City control
The following table lists party control in the most populous municipalities, including provincial capitals (shown in bold). Gains for a party are displayed with the cell's background shaded in that party's colour.

Municipalities

Avilés
Population: 83,511

Gijón
Population: 270,211

Langreo
Population: 47,796

Mieres
Population: 48,418

Oviedo
Population: 202,938

San Martín del Rey Aurelio
Population: 20,186

Siero
Population: 48,569

See also
2003 Asturian regional election

References

Asturias
2003